Malcolm Campbell, professionally known as Paul Oxley, is an English songwriter, lyricist and producer living in Helsinki, Finland. He is the lead singer of the Finnish rock band Paul Oxley's Unit.

References

Year of birth missing (living people)
Living people
English emigrants to Finland
English songwriters
English lyricists
English record producers